The following is a list of forces involved in the Battle of Amiens of World War I fought from August 8 to August 11, 1918.

Allies
Allied forces at Amiens were under the supreme command of General Ferdinand Foch.

British Fourth Army

General Sir Henry Rawlinson

British III Corps – Lieutenant General Sir Richard Butler
47th (1/2nd London) Division
12th (Eastern) Division
18th (Eastern) Division
58th (2/1st London) Division
10th Tank Battalion – 36 Mark V tanks
Australian Corps – Lieutenant General Sir John Monash
1st Australian Division
2nd Australian Division
3rd Australian Division
4th Australian Division
5th Australian Division
33rd US Division
5th Tank Brigade – 2nd, 8th, 13th Bn Tank Corps with 108 Mark V tank; 15th Bn Tank Corps with 36 Mark V* Tank; 17th (Armoured Car) Bn (Austin Armoured Cars.
Canadian Corps – Lieutenant General Sir Arthur Currie
1st Canadian Division
2nd Canadian Division
3rd Canadian Division
4th Canadian Division
4th Tank Brigade – 108 Mark V tank, 36 Mark V* Tank
British Cavalry Corps – Lieutenant General Sir Charles Kavanagh
1st Cavalry Division
2nd Cavalry Division
3rd Cavalry Division
3rd Tank Brigade – 72 Whippet tank of 3 Bn and 6 Bn Tank Corps
Reserve
17th (Northern) Division
32nd Division
63rd (Royal Naval) Division
9th Tank Battalion – 36 Mark V tanks

Royal Air Force air support

(Major General John Salmond)
V Brigade
15th (Corps) Wing – 110 aircraft
22nd (Army) Wing – 222 aircraft
IX Brigade
9th Wing – 2 fighter sqns, 2 bomber sqns, 1 reconnaissance sqn. (99 aircraft)
51st Wing – 3 fighter sqns, 2 bomber sqns. (101 aircraft)
54th Wing – 2 night-fighter sqns, 4 night-bomber sqns (76 aircraft)
III Brigade (available in support)
13th (Army) Wing – 136 aircraft
I Brigade (available in support) – 19 aircraft
X Brigade (available in support) – 19 aircraft

French First Army
General Marie-Eugène Debeney
XXXI Corps – General Paul-Louis Toulorge
37th Division
42nd Division
66th Division
153rd Division
126th Division
IX Corps – General Noël Garnier-Duplessix
3rd Division
15th Colonial Division
X Corps – General Charles Vandenburg
60th Division
152nd Division
166th Division
XXXV Corps – General Charles Jacquot
46th Division
133rd Division
169th Division
II Cavalry Corps – General Felix Robillot
2nd Cavalry Division
4th Cavalry Division
6th Cavalry Division

French Third Army
The French Third Army played a peripheral role in the battle and was commanded by Georges Humbert
XV Corps – General Jacques de Riols de Fonclare
67th Division
74th Division
123rd Division
XXXIV Corps – General Alphonse Nudant
6th Division
121st Division
129th Division
165th Division

Division Aerienne
 I Brigade – 3 fighter groups, 3 bomber groups
 II Brigade – 3 fighter groups, 2 bomber groups
 Groupe Lauren – 2 night-bomber groups
 Groupe Weiller

Total: 1,104 aircraft

Germans

The German Second and Eighteenth armies were part of Army Group Rupprecht, commanded by  Crown Prince Rupprecht

Second Army
General Georg von der Marwitz
54th Corps – Generalleutnant Alfred von Larisch
27th Division
54th Reserve Division
233rd Division
243rd Division
26th Reserve Division – (From Seventeenth Army, 9 August)
XI Corps – Generalleutnant Viktor Kühne
13th Division
41st Division
43rd Reserve Division
108th Division
107th Division – (From Second Army reserve, 8 August)
21st Division – (From Second Army reserve, 9 August)
5th Bavarian Division – (From Seventeenth Army, 8 August)
38th Division – (From Sixth Army, 9 August)
51st Corps – Generalleutnant Eberhard von Hofacker
14th Bavarian Division
109th Division
117th Division
192nd Division
225th Division
Air Support
Jagdgruppe 2
Jagdgruppe Greim
Bombengeschwader 7
Fliegerabteilung (Lichtbildgerät) 40
Fliegerabteilung 17,33
Fliegerabteilung (Artillerie) 217,224,207,219,232,241,269
Schlachtstaffel 17

Eighteenth Army
General Oskar von Hutier

III Corps – Generalleutnant Walther von Lüttwitz
24th Division
25th Reserve Division
1st Reserve Division
79th Reserve Division – (From Seventh Army, 9 August)
IX Corps – Generalleutnant Horst Ritter und Edler von Oetinger
2nd Division
11th Division
82nd Reserve Division
I Bavarian Corps – Generalleutnant Nikolaus Ritter von Endres (Corps was formed during the battle on 10 August)
Alpenkorps – (from Fourth Army, 10 August)
121st Division – (from Ninth Army, 10 August)
(The remaining corps of Eighteenth Army played only a peripheral role in the battle.)
I Reserve Corps – Generalleutnant Kurt von Morgen
75th Reserve Division
206th Division
119th Division – (Sent to 51st Corps, Second Army, 8 August)
XXVI Reserve Corps – Generalleutnant Oskar von Watter
17th Reserve Division
54th Division
204th Division – (Sent to I Bavarian Corps, 10 August)
XVIII Reserve Corps – Generalleutnant Ludwig Sieger
3rd Bavarian Division
105th Division
221st Division – (Sent to III Corps, 9 August)

Luftstreitkräfte (air support)
Jagdstaffel 24, 42, 44, 78
Bombengeschwader 4
Fliegerabteilung (Lichtbildgerät) 23
Fliegerabteilung (Artillerie) 2, 245, 14,212,238,203
Schlachtstaffel 36

References

Bibliography 
 
 

Forces involved in the Battle of Amiens
Amiens
Amiens 1918 forces
Amiens 1918 forces
Amiens 1918 forces
Amiens 1918 forces
Somme (department)
Amiens
Amiens 1918 forces